Guy Richard Pedder (7 July 1892 – 6 April 1964) was an English cricketer active in the 1910s, 1920s and early 1930s. Born at Brandiston Hall in Brandiston, Norfolk, Pedder was a right-handed batsman who played as a wicket-keeper who played the majority of his cricket in minor counties cricket, though he did make five appearances in first-class cricket.

Career
Educated at Repton School and later attending Trinity College, Oxford, Pedder made his debut in minor counties cricket for Norfolk against Cambridgeshire in the 1913 Minor Counties Championship, with him making a further appearance in that season against Glamorgan. In the following season, he appeared in three further Minor Counties Championship matches.

References

External links

1892 births
1964 deaths
People educated at Repton School
Alumni of Trinity College, Oxford
English cricketers
Norfolk cricketers
Minor Counties cricketers
Gloucestershire cricketers
Free Foresters cricketers
People from Broadland (district)
Sportspeople from Norfolk
People from Hoxne
Wicket-keepers